The New Mexico Museum of Art is an art museum in Santa Fe governed by the state of New Mexico. It is one of four state-run museums in Santa Fe that are part of the Museum of New Mexico.  It is located at 107 West Palace Avenue, one block off the historic Santa Fe Plaza.  It was given its current name in 2007, having previously been referred to as The Museum of Fine Arts.

History
The building was designed by architect Isaac Rapp and completed in 1917. It is an example of Pueblo Revival Style architecture, and one of Santa Fe's best-known representations of the synthesis of Native American and Spanish Colonial design styles. The façade was based on the mission churches of Acoma, San Felipe, Cochiti, Laguna, Santa Ana and Pecos.

Collections
The museum’s art collection includes over 20,000 paintings, photographs, sculptures, prints, drawings and mixed-media works. Notable artists in the collection include Ansel Adams, Gustave Baumann, Brian O'Connor, Georgia O'Keeffe, Fritz Scholder, T. C. Cannon, Bruce Nauman, Luis Jimenez, Maria Martinez, members of the Ashcan School, Los Cinco Pintores, Transcendental Painting Group, and the Taos Society of Artists.

Paintings

St. Francis Auditorium

The St. Francis Auditorium, located in the New Mexico Museum of Art, is the venue for various cultural and musical organizations, including the Santa Fe Chamber Music Festival and the Santa Fe Community Orchestra. The auditorium has a seating capacity of 450. The auditorium displays several murals depicting St. Francis of Assisi which were originally designed by Donald Beauregard and completed by Carlos Vierra and Kenneth M. Chapman.

Library
The museum library contains art books, periodicals, biographical files of artists whose work is collected by the museum and catalogs of the museum's exhibitions since 1917.

References

Citations

Works cited

External links
 

1917 establishments in New Mexico
Art museums and galleries in New Mexico
Art museums established in 1917
Culture of Santa Fe, New Mexico
Institutions accredited by the American Alliance of Museums
Modern art museums
Museums in Santa Fe, New Mexico
Museums of American art
Pueblo Revival architecture in Santa Fe, New Mexico